Carposina cervinella is a moth of the family Carposinidae.It was first described by Lord Walsingham in 1907. It is endemic to the Hawaiian island of Kauai.

References

Carposinidae
Endemic moths of Hawaii